Phil Montgomery (born July 7, 1957) is an American politician who served as a member of the Wisconsin State Assembly for the District 4. He then served on the as a member of the Public Service Commission of Wisconsin from 2011 to 2017.

Early life and education 
He was born in Hammond, Indiana on July 7, 1957. He attended Thornton Fractional North High School in Calumet City, Illinois, and earned a Bachelor of Science in Business and Commerce from the University of Houston–Downtown in 1988.

Career
After graduating from college, Montgomery worked as a systems engineer.

As member of the Wisconsin State Assembly from 1998 to 2010,  Montgomery served on the Special Committee on Clean Energy Jobs, Joint Committee on Finance, Assembly Committee on Energy and Utilities, Joint Committee on Information Policy and Technology, and served on other related committees in the Assembly and on the Board of Directors of the Wisconsin Public Utility Institute.

During the 2007–2008 legislative session, Montgomery authored legislation providing statewide video franchising. The governor and others supported the bill. The bill provided a much simpler process for a franchise, while eliminating some traditional franchise requirements such as service to almost everyone in the territory. The bill had bipartisan support, with the La Crosse Tribune noting Democratic Party chairman Joe Weinke registered to lobby for AT&T while the bill was before the Democratic controlled Senate. In 2006, when the proposal was being developed, AT&T contributed $2,250 to Montgomery's campaign. He also supported passage of the Great Lakes Compact and the use of renewable energy.

Montgomery voted against AB61, a bill that "prohibits any incumbent partisan elective state official from accepting any political contribution from the first Monday in January of each odd-numbered year through the date of enactment of the biennial budget act." Montgomery has introduced and strongly supported AB 285, a bill that would allow increases in the cost of basic telephone service.

Personal life 
Montgomery lives in Middleton, Wisconsin He is married and has two children.

References

External links
 
 Follow the Money - Phil Montgomery
2008 2006 2004 2002 2000 1998 campaign contributions
Campaign 2008 campaign contributions at Wisconsin Democracy Campaign

Members of the Wisconsin State Assembly
University of Houston–Downtown alumni
Politicians from Green Bay, Wisconsin
People from Hammond, Indiana
1957 births
Living people
21st-century American politicians
People from Middleton, Wisconsin